Borhan bin Aman Shah (born 14 May 1962) is a Malaysian politician and currently serves as Member of Selangor State Legislative Assembly for Tanjong Sepat and Selangor State Executive Councillor since 17 September 2020.

Election results

References

1962 births
Living people
People's Justice Party (Malaysia) politicians
Members of the Selangor State Legislative Assembly
Selangor state executive councillors